The 2017 iKON Japan Dome Tour was the third tour by iKON in Japan. The tour began on May 20, 2017 in Osaka at Kyocera Dome, and concluded on November 12, 2017 in Kobe. The tour had a total attendance of 323,000, making it iKON's biggest and longest Japanese tour. Despite being marketed as a dome tour, it is not actually a true dome tour, as only two domes were included.

Development
On February 11, 2017, it was announced that iKON will start their first dome tour, with two shows set to be on Kyocera Dome and Seibu Prince Dome, with 90,000 fans expected to come. This mark them as the fastest group to make a concert in Japan dome in just one year and 9 months since debuting in Japan. On June 18, an additional 22 concerts in eight Japanese cities were announced by YGEX, with 233,000 fans are expected to attend their concerts, making it the longest and the largest arena tour held by iKON in Japan.

Set list
This set list is from 'iKON Japan Dome Tour 2017 (DVD/Blu-ray).

 "Bling Bling"
 "Sinosijak (Remix)"
 "Just Another Boy"
 "My Type"
 "#WYD"
 "Today"
 "BE I" (B.I)
 "Holup!" Bobby)
 "Anthem" (B.I & Bobby)
 "Just Go"
 "Apology"
 "Wait For Me"
 "Airplane"
 "Climax"
 "Rhythm Ta Remix (Rock Ver.)"
 "B-Day"
 "Dumb & Dumber"
 "What's Wrong"
 "Love Me"
 "Welcome Back"
Encore
 "M.U.P"
 "Long Time No See"
 "Rhythm Ta Remix (Rock Ver.)"

Tour dates

DVD and Blu-ray
iKON Japan Dome Tour 2017iKON Japan Dome Tour 2017'' is a live DVD & Blu-ray by the group, released on September 27 in Japan. The DVD/Blu-ray was filmed during the group first ever concert on Japanese Dome Kyocera Dome.

The DVD/Blu-ray came in 4 versions, includes a total of the 22 songs that were sung live, including a documentary the show, focus dance of 4 songs, a collection of the group best stages from their second show at Seibu Prince Dome and a special features section.

Track listing

Charts
Upon it release the DVD/Blu-ray topped Oricon Daily Chart. In the first week it debuted at number one on the Oricon DVD Chart, making it iKON second number one on the chart, the Blu-ray edition also debuted at number 6, both sold 9,900 copies in the first week.

Sales

References

External links
 Official Japanese website

2017 concert tours
IKon concert tours
Concert tours of Japan